Alex Tilley may refer to:
Alexandra Tilley (born 1993), Scottish alpine ski racer
Alex Tilley, founder of Tilley Endurables hatmakers